St Mark's was an English association club based in Windsor.  Its players were pupils and masters attending St Mark's School, under the headmastership of the Reverend E. Hawtrey, whose sons played for the club.  The school later became the Imperial Service College.

History

The club entered the FA Cup once, in 1877–78.  It was drawn to play Barnes, with choice of ground, but scratched before playing.  This appears to be because a number of its players had pledged their allegiance to other clubs in the Windsor and Slough area, including Swifts F.C. and Remnants F.C.; the latter club was made up solely of masters from the school.   

The club provided three players to the Berkshire Football Association representative side in 1876–77.

The first recorded match for the club was on 18 November 1876, a 2–1 home defeat to Runnymede F.C, and matches are recorded for the club until 1888.  The club's pitch was also used for fixtures for other clubs in the area, when their own grounds were unavailable; the ground hosted an FA Cup tie in 1883.

Notable players

Arthur Bambridge, future England international

John Hawtrey, future England international

Rev. William Blackmore, chosen to play for England against Wales but forced to withdraw through injury

Sir Charles Hawtrey, actor

Colours

The club is likely to have played in magenta, being the college colour; possibly taken from the original rowing colour of Cambridge University.

Other St Mark clubs

There were two London clubs active at the time under the name St Mark's; St Mark's Guild, a team from a teacher training college who changed their name to Rangers in 1877, and St Mark's College from Chelsea, a team of undergraduates from a college linked to the teacher training college, who played into the late 1880s, and whose old boys formed a football club (Old St Mark's F.C.) in 1885.

References

Defunct football clubs in England
Association football clubs established in the 19th century
Defunct football clubs in Berkshire